Lady Thompson may refer to:

Annie Thompson (née Affleck) (1845–1913), wife of the Prime Minister of Canada 
Ann Thompson (née Potts) (1869–1946), wife of Luke Thompson (politician)
Kate Fanny Thompson (1825–1904), married name of English composer Kate Loder
Lady Gwen Thompson, pseudonym of author Phyllis Thompson (née Healy) (1928–1986)